John George Butcher, 1st Baron Danesfort, KC (15 November 1853 – 30 June 1935), known as Sir John Butcher, Bt, between 1918 and 1924, was a British barrister and Conservative Party politician.

Background and education
Butcher was the second son of the Most Reverend Samuel Butcher, Bishop of Meath, the grandson of Vice-Admiral Samuel Butcher (1770–1849), and the younger brother of Samuel Henry Butcher. His mother was Mary, daughter of John Leahy. He was educated at Marlborough College and Trinity College, Cambridge, and was called to the Bar, Lincoln's Inn, in 1878.

Political career
Butcher was Member of Parliament for York from 1892 to 1906 and from 1910 to 1923, in 1918 becoming the first Member of Parliament for York to be the sole parliamentary representative, as the constituency had previously had two MPs. He was made a Queen's Counsel in 1897, awarded the honorary freedom of the City of York in 1906 and created a baronet, of Danesfort in the County of Kerry, in 1918. In 1924 he was further honoured when he was elevated to the peerage as Baron Danesfort, of Danesfort in the County of Kerry.

Personal life
Lord Danesfort married Alice Mary Gordon, author and domestic electrical pioneer, daughter of J. E. L. Brandreth, and widow of J.E.H. Gordon in 1898. There were no children from the marriage, but three step children from her previous marriage. Alice, Lady Danesfort died on 18 June 1929. Lord Danesfort survived her by six years and died in June 1935, aged 81, at which time the baronetcy and barony became extinct.

References

External links 

 

1853 births
1935 deaths
Barons in the Peerage of the United Kingdom
Butcher, John
Butcher, John
Butcher, John
Butcher, John
Butcher, John
Butcher, John
Butcher, John
Butcher, John
UK MPs who were granted peerages
People educated at Marlborough College
Alumni of Trinity College, Cambridge
Members of Lincoln's Inn
19th-century King's Counsel
Barons created by George V